Laura Palma (born January 30, 1985 in Mexico City, Mexico) is Mexican actress and model. She studied acting in  Centro de Formacion Actoral of TV Azteca.

Filmography

References

External links
 

Living people
Mexican television actresses
Mexican telenovela actresses
People educated at Centro de Estudios y Formación Actoral
1985 births